Georgia Southwestern State University (GSW) is a state university public university in Americus, Georgia. Founded as the Third District Agricultural and Mechanical School in 1906, the university was established and is administrated by the Georgia Board of Regents of the University System of Georgia. The historic core of the campus is listed in the National Register of Historic Places.

History
In 1906, the Georgia General Assembly passed a resolution establishing one agricultural and mechanical school in each of the state's eleven congressional districts. Signed by Governor Joseph M. Terrell, the bill left the location of the schools up to local communities that offered the most financial support. Oversight of the schools came from the Georgia State College of Agriculture and a local board consisting of one member from each county in the school's congressional district. Funding for the schools came from taxes and fees associated with fertilizer and oil inspection.

Third District Agricultural and Mechanical School (1906-1926)

From the 15 counties that made up Georgia's Third Congressional District, Sumter County pledged the most support for a new school: 300 acres of land along the Seaboard Airline Railroad, $40,000, and water supply. The educational support from Americus and Sumter County was in keeping with the local boosterism that resulted in frenetic building campaign from the Savannah, Americus, and Montgomery Railway and the Windsor Hotel in the 1890s to the Rylander Theatre in 1921.

From 1907 to 1926, the Third District Agricultural and Mechanical School was closer to a boarding school for children than a modern college. It prepared students for farm work and meet the requirements for admission to the State College of Agriculture in Athens. The minimum age for admission was thirteen years old for girls and fourteen years old for boys. The curriculum for boys included plants, soils, animals, and fertilizers, construction, concrete, and other physical and horticultural skills. The curriculum for girls included many of the same subjects as boys as well as courses on household skills from cooking and sewing to sanitation and first aid.

Third District Agricultural and Normal College (1926-1932)

The state began moving away from Agricultural and Mechanical curriculum by the 1920s. In 1924, the school's trustees authorized a one-year curriculum for teachers and eliminated one year from the A&M curriculum. Two years later, the Georgia General Assembly converted the school into a teacher's college and changed its name to the Third District Agricultural and Normal College. The State Department of Education granted teacher certification to all students who completed the teacher training program.

Georgia Southwestern College (1932-1996)

The college joined the University System of Georgia (USG) in 1932 along with other state-supported institutions of higher learning in Georgia. The newly formed USG was also placed under the jurisdiction of the Board of Regents. Now a member of the USG, Georgia Southwestern College and continued to offer its two-year curriculum.

The Board of Regents approved Georgia Southwestern College to transition to a four-year institution in 1964. The first bachelor's degrees were conferred in June 1968.

The name of the institution was changed to Georgia Southwestern State University in July 1996.

Since becoming a four-year institution, Georgia Southwestern has developed several master's programs over the years. A Master of Education degree was approved by the Board of Regents in 1973 followed by a Specialist in Education in 1982. The Master of Science in Administration was made part of the curriculum in 1983. The Master of Science in Computer Science was added in the Spring of 1986, and the Master of Business Administration was added to the curriculum in 2003. Most recently, the Master of Arts in English was added in the fall of 2011, and the Master Science in Nursing (online) was added in the fall of 2012.

Academics
Georgia Southwestern's academic degrees are offered through four colleges, which include the following:

The College of Arts and Sciences
The College of Arts and Sciences at GSW offers undergraduate degrees and a Master of Arts degree. It has the only undergraduate art program in the Georgia State University System with a concentration in glass blowing.

College of Business and Computing
The College of Business and Computing offers the Bachelor of Business Administration, Master of Business Administration, Bachelor of Science degrees, and the Master of Science in computer science. The college is accredited by the Association to Advance Collegiate Schools of Business.

College of Education
The College of Education is accredited by the National Council for Accreditation of Teacher Education (NCATE). All initial teacher preparation programs are approved by the Georgia Professional Standards Commission (PSC). The school offers bachelor's, master's and specialist degrees.

College of Nursing and Health Sciences
The College of Nursing and Health Sciences offers a Bachelor of Science in Nursing (BSN) degree through three tracks:
 Generic
 RN to BSN
 Accelerated BSN
 Master of Science in Nursing - online
There is a Georgia Southwestern Association of Nursing Students and a chapter of Sigma Theta Tau, Mu Pi.

Dual and cooperative programs
Georgia Southwestern and the Georgia Institute of Technology offer a dual-degree program in engineering leading to a bachelor's degree in science or mathematics from Georgia Southwestern and a bachelor's degree in engineering from Georgia Tech. The university also offers cooperative programs with South Georgia Technical College and several two-year institutions within the university system, culminating in a baccalaureate degree from Georgia Southwestern.

Athletics

The Georgia Southwestern State (GSW) athletic teams are called the Hurricanes. The university is a member of the Division II level of the National Collegiate Athletic Association (NCAA), primarily competing in the Peach Belt Conference (PBC) since the 2006–07 academic year. The Hurricanes previously competed in the Southern States Athletic Conference (SSAC; formerly known as Georgia–Alabama–Carolina Conference (GACC) until after the 2003–04 school year) of the National Association of Intercollegiate Athletics (NAIA) from 1999–2000 to 2005–06.

GSW competes in ten intercollegiate varsity sports: Men's sports include baseball, basketball, cross country, golf and soccer; while women's sports include basketball, cross country, soccer, softball and tennis. Club sports include eSports.

Football was played at the university between 1983 and 1989. The men's tennis program was discontinued in 2019, while men's cross country was added.

Campus and student life

Housing 
GSW has four sets of dorm complexes, most of which bear tree-related monikers.

All freshmen are housed in Southwestern Oaks 1 and 2. The Oaks facilities offer both shared and private bedroom suites and semi-private bathrooms. Freshmen are allowed to park cars on campus in the parking lot located next to Oaks 1 and 2. Southwestern Oaks is also home to GSW's First Year Experience Program, which includes programming to assist in the transition from high school to college such as tutoring and opportunities to become involved in campus life.

Southwestern Pines offers apartment-style housing for upperclassmen.

Southwestern Magnolia offers private bedroom suites for upperclassman students.

Previously a women's dormitory, Beth King Duncan Hall now serves as a co-educational, overflow residence hall, named in honor of Beth King Duncan, a former GSW professor of 20 years.

Facilities

Library 
Georgia Southwestern is home to the James Earl Carter Library, named in honor of the father of former President Jimmy Carter. In addition to the library's own collection, books and other materials may be borrowed from other University System of Georgia libraries through interlibrary loan. The James Earl Carter Library also has a cooperative lending agreement with the local Lake Blackshear Regional Library and the South Georgia Technical College Library.

Other services and materials available to students through the library are audio-visual materials, microfiche documents and current newspapers through the Education Resources Information Center (ERIC) and select government documents. The Library also has computer workstations and a computer lab.

Student Success Center/Storm Dome 
The Student Success Center (SSC) houses several recreational facilities for the campus.

The GSW Fitness Center is located on the first floor of the Student Success Center. The Fitness Center has a full weight room and various other machines including treadmills and stationary bikes. The center also has several flat-screen televisions to watch while working out.
In addition to the fitness center, the SSC is the location of several racquetball courts, the intramural basketball court, a rock-climbing wall, and a Chick-fil-A/Boar's Head restaurant.

Marshall Student Center 
The Marshall Student Center is the location of the university cafeteria; Higher Grounds Café, a small coffee shop; Provisions on Demand (P.O.D.), a convenience store; the university bookstore and the campus post office.

Student organizations 
GSW has many major-related clubs and organizations including the American Institute of Professional Geologists Student Chapter, the GSW Association of Nursing Students (GSWANS), Chemistry Club, History Club, Geology Club, Psychology/Sociology Club, Exercise Science and Wellness Club, and more.

Campus ministries include the Presbyterian Student Center, the Wesley Foundation, the Baptist Collegiate Ministry (BCM), and the non-denominational Christian Student Center (CSC).

Athletic clubs and organizations include the Outdoor Club as well as an active Campus Recreation and Intramural Sports program featuring intramural flag football and basketball.

Honor societies include the Alpha Lambda Delta Honor Society for first-year students with a GPA of 3.5 or higher, Epsilon Delta Lambda for online students, the National Honor Society for Leadership and Success (Sigma Alpha Pi) and Alpha Psi Omega, the National Theatre Honor Society.

GSW has several organizations in media and arts including the Sou’Wester, the student newspaper; Hurricane Watch, GSW's student-produced video organization; and Sirocco, GSW's magazine for the arts.

Georgia Southwestern has the following sororities and fraternities:

Interfraternity Council
 Chi Phi
 Kappa Sigma
 Sigma Chi

Panhellenic Council
 Kappa Delta
 Zeta Tau Alpha

National Panhellenic Council
 Alpha Kappa Alpha sorority
 Kappa Alpha Psi fraternity
 Alpha Phi Alpha fraternity
 Delta Sigma Theta sorority
 Omega Psi Phi fraternity
 Sigma Gamma Rho sorority
 Zeta Phi Beta sorority

Centers and institutes

The Rosalynn Carter Institute for Caregiving 
Former First Lady Rosalynn Carter is the Board Chair of the Rosalynn Carter Institute (RCI) at Georgia Southwestern State University. The RCI was established in 1987 and works to address issues related to caregiving in America. The Institute focuses its work on both family and professional caregivers for individuals living with chronic illness and disabilities, limitations related to aging, and other health concerns. The work of the institute is extensive both locally (in Americus), throughout Georgia, and the United States. For example, the Institute provides scholarships and fellowships to students throughout Georgia, offers a certificate program in caregiving at the university, conducts needs assessments and research on caregivers, provides training and education for caregivers through its own curriculum, operates a Caregiver Resource Center for residents of southwest Georgia, offers a number of national caregiver awards including the Rosalynn Carter Caregiver Award, and partners with Johnson & Johnson to support innovative community caregiving programs throughout the United States.

Operation Family Caregiver (OFC) - an RCI program launched in 2012 - is an evidence-based one-on-one support program that builds strong military families and teaches problem-solving to families living with post-traumatic stress, traumatic brain injury, and/or a physical disability. OFC will pilot a new volunteer program in December 2015 thanks to funding from the Bristol-Myers Squibb Foundation and a new partnership with Blue Star Families, the largest chapter-based, volunteer, military family engagement organization in the nation.

Accreditation
Georgia Southwestern State University is accredited by the Commission on Colleges of the Southern Association of Colleges and Schools to award associate, baccalaureate, masters, and specialist degrees.

Notable alumni
 Jaha Dukureh (2013), women's rights activist
 Major General Thomas M. Carden, Jr, The Adjutant General of Georgia 
 Jimmy Carter, former president of the United States
 Rosalynn Smith Carter (1946), wife of Jimmy Carter and former First Lady of the United States
 Griffin B. Bell (1936), former U.S. Attorney General under President Jimmy Carter 
 The Honorable Robert H. Jordan (1936), former Chief Justice of the Georgia Supreme Court
 Lucas Knecht, youngest ever international soccer player for the Northern Mariana Islands
 Mary Elizabeth Lado, professional figure competitor
 Vincent Norrman, Swedish professional golfer
 Gloria Carter Spann, sister of former United States President Jimmy Carter
 Etchu Tabe, American soccer player

References

External links

 
 Official athletics website

 
Educational institutions established in 1906
Public universities and colleges in Georgia (U.S. state)
Universities and colleges accredited by the Southern Association of Colleges and Schools
Education in Sumter County, Georgia
Buildings and structures in Sumter County, Georgia
1906 establishments in Georgia (U.S. state)